The Queens' Bedroom is on the second floor of the White House, part of a guest suite of rooms that includes the Queens' Sitting Room.

Furnishings 
The room has been furnished in 1868 Federal style since the Truman reconstruction. The bed thought to have belonged to Andrew Jackson is used here. It was donated in 1902 and first used in what is today the Lincoln Bedroom.

History 
Before the construction of the West Wing in 1902, it was the usual bedroom and office for presidential private secretaries. Many male relatives, including sons of presidents, used the room as their bedroom. The room became a regular bedroom suite when the president's staff moved into the West Wing. When the White House was gutted and rebuilt during the Truman administration, this room was rebuilt as a guest suite with its own bathroom.

Winston Churchill stayed in the room when he visited Presidents Franklin D. Roosevelt and Harry S. Truman before and after World War II. Mamie Eisenhower once had her son, John, and his wife, Barbara, move to another room because she felt that only queens and similar state guests should stay in this room. Jacqueline Kennedy considered taking the room for herself in 1961, but settled instead on the traditional master suite.

Between 1902 and 1963, the room was known as the Rose Room. Anna Roosevelt, daughter of Franklin and Eleanor Roosevelt, moved into the room in 1944 and served as the President's assistant and White House hostess during her mother's frequent absences. President and Mrs. Kennedy used the Queens' Bedroom while the master suite was being decorated in their first weeks in the house.

References and notes 

Anthony, Carl Sferrazza. America's First Families: An Inside View of 200 Years of Private Life in the White House. New York: Simon and Schuster, 2000.

External links 
 White House Museum: The Queens' Bedroom
 White House Museum: Franklin Roosevelt to Winston Churchill

Rooms in the White House